O Jung-hup (1910–1939) was a Korean military officer who fought the Japanese with Kim Il-sung.

O was born into a poor family in Seson-ri, Onsong County of North Hamgyong Province, on 10 July 1910. He died in the Liukesong battle in Dunhua County on 17 December 1939, aged 29.

Family

The O family are influential in the North Korean regime. , his nephew O Kuk-ryol was Vice-Chairman of the National Defense Commission of the DPRK.

References 

North Korean military personnel
1910 births
1939 deaths
People from Onsong County